François Ledrappier (born 17 January 1946) is a French mathematician.

Ledrappier graduated from the École Polytechnique in 1967 and received his doctorate from Pierre and Marie Curie University (Paris 6) in 1975 under the supervision of Jacques Neveu. Ledrappier taught at Paris 6 and then became a professor at South Bend's University of Notre Dame, where he is now professor emeritus.

His research deals with asymptotic properties of group actions and related problems. He has published articles on dynamical systems theory, compact negatively curved manifolds and their abelian covers, linear actions and random walks on linear groups, geometric measure theory, and zero entropy algebraic actions of free abelian groups.

In 1994 Ledrappier was an invited speaker at the International Congress of Mathematicians in Zurich. In 2016 he received the Sophie Germain Prize.

His doctoral students include Nalini Anantharaman.

Selected publications

References

1946 births
Living people
20th-century French mathematicians
21st-century French mathematicians
University of Paris alumni
Academic staff of the University of Paris
University of Notre Dame faculty